Babenko is a surname. Notable people with the name include:
Aleksei Babenko (born 1972), Russian footballer
Alexandr Babenko (born 1980), Kazakhstani ski-orienteer
Dmytro Babenko (born 1978), Ukrainian footballer
Dmitry Babenko (born 1985), Kazakhstani speed skater
Ruslan Babenko (born 1992), Ukrainian footballer
Sergei Babenko (disambiguation), multiple individuals
Valery Babenko (born 1964), Ukrainian politician
Yuri Babenko (born 1978), Russian ice hockey player

See also
 
Babenko–Beckner inequality
Babenco

Ukrainian-language surnames